Hertzberg is a surname. Notable people with the surname include:

 A. M. Hertzberg (1852–1917), businessman in Brisbane, Australia
 Arthur Hertzberg (1921–2006), Polish-born American rabbi
 Charles Hertzberg (1886–1944), Major-General of the Royal Canadian Engineering Corps
 Daniel Hertzberg, American journalist
 Ebbe Carsten Horneman Hertzberg, Norwegian member of the Council of State Division in Stockholm 1884
 Ewald Friedrich, Count von Hertzberg (1725–1795), Prussian statesman
 Frederick Hertzberg (1923–2000), American psychologist
 Gustav Hertzberg (1826–1907), German historian
 Hendrik Hertzberg, American journalist
 Joseph Hertzberg (d. 1870), Russian writer and translator
 Nils Christian Egede Hertzberg, Norwegian Minister of Education and Church Affairs 1882–1884
 Robert Hertzberg, American attorney, businessman and politician
 Sidney Hertzberg (1922–2005), American pro basketball player
 Vicki Hertzberg, American biostatistician

See also 
 Hertzberg Island, Ontario
 Herzberg (disambiguation)

German-language surnames